The Harris Farm is a historic late First Period farmhouse in Marblehead, Massachusetts.  It is a rare example of a three-bay house from that period.  It was built c. 1720 as a two-story structure with one room on each floor, and an integral leanto section in the rear. The leanto section was later raised to a full two stories and the roof was rebuilt.  Further additions in the 1950s added converted 19th-century sheds to the rear of the house, and the front door was replaced with a Colonial Revival style door.

The house was listed on the National Register of Historic Places in 1990.

See also
National Register of Historic Places listings in Essex County, Massachusetts

References

Farms on the National Register of Historic Places in Massachusetts
Houses in Marblehead, Massachusetts
National Register of Historic Places in Essex County, Massachusetts